State Route 347 (SR 347) is a state-maintained, secondary highway in eastern Tennessee, beginning at I-26 in the Rock Springs community of Kingsport and ending at the intersection of US 11W and SR 70 in Rogersville.

The highway travels through a gap in Bays Mountain at the border between Sullivan and Hawkins counties.

Route description
SR 347 begins as East Main Street at an intersection with SR 70 and US 11W in Rogersville, SR 347 goes southwest toward downtown and after 1 mile as East Main Street SR 347 turns east on to Burem Pike and soon after leaves Rogersville city limits and after traveling for at total of 3.5 miles SR 347 crosses the Holston River. It then goes through rural southern Hawkins County. After entering Sullivan County SR 347 comes into the community of Sullivan Gardens and junctions with SR 93 and comes to an end at I-26/US 23 in Kingsport.

Major intersections

See also
List of Tennessee state highways

Notes

347
Transportation in Hawkins County, Tennessee
Transportation in Sullivan County, Tennessee
Rogersville, Tennessee